Anurag Singh (born 24 April 1971) is an Indian politician and a member of Legislative Assembly, Uttar Pradesh of India. He represents the Chunar constituency in Mirzapur district of Uttar Pradesh. Anurag Singh is Bhartiya Janta Party MLA from Chunar assembly of district Mirzapur for the second consecutive time.  He is the son of Om Prakash Singh, ex BJP Uttar Pradesh State President.

Early life and education 
He completed his primary education in Varanasi. He pursued B.A. from DAV Varanasi. Later, he did his MBA from Bundelkhand University.

Political career 
Anurag Singh belongs to a political family of Uttar Pradesh. His father, Om Prakash Singh had been cabinet minister in Kalyan Singh government as well as state president of Uttar Pradesh.

Anurag Singh contested Uttar Pradesh Assembly Election as Bharatiya Janata Party candidate and defeated Samajwadi Party candidate Jagtamba Singh Patel by a margin of 62,228 votes.After that, again in the year 2022, Anurag Singh won a big victory by defeating Apna Dal Kamerawadi and Samajwadi Party's alliance candidate Ramashankar Prasad Singh by 47614 votes. 

He joined Rashtriya Swayamsevak Sangh (RSS) in the year 1989 as Swayam Sewak. He became "Mukhya Shikshak" in the RSS in 1990 and later, he joined ABVP and became vice president of DAV unit. In the year 2008, he became member of State Working Committee of Bhartiya Janta Yuva Morcha.
 
He contested parliamentary election from Mirzapur in 2009 from BJP, but did not get victory. In the year 2010, he became member of BJP state working committee of Uttar Pradesh.

Political movements 
During Ram Janmbhoomi Andolan in 1991, Anurag Singh painted several walls of Varanasi, for which he got arrested. He was the first to be arrested at midnight 2 a.m. in this protest.

Posts held

See also
 Uttar Pradesh Legislative Assembly
 Chunar (Assembly constituency)
 Mirzapur
 Bhartiya Janta Party

References

1971 births
Living people
Bharatiya Janata Party politicians from Uttar Pradesh
Bundelkhand University alumni
People from Mirzapur
Uttar Pradesh MLAs 2017–2022
Uttar Pradesh MLAs 2022–2027